Treffort-Cuisiat is a former commune in the Ain department in eastern France. On 1 January 2016, it was merged into the new commune Val-Revermont.

Treffort and Cuisiat were merged in 1972.

Geography
The Sevron formed most of the commune's southwestern border.

Population

Culture
Cuisiat is home to the Revermont museum in the old school house.

See also
Communes of the Ain department

References

External links

Official website
The Revermont Museum

Former communes of Ain
Ain communes articles needing translation from French Wikipedia
Populated places disestablished in 2016